The Canadian Ski Museum (French: Le Musée canadien du ski) is a museum based in Mont-Tremblant, Quebec. It was founded in 1971 by a dedicated group of volunteers and ski enthusiasts. Shortly thereafter, in 1975 the museum was incorporated. Since 2011 it has left the Ottawa location with collection online or stored.

The museum's founders recognized the rapid expansion and development of the sport of skiing over the years; this inspired them to collect not only the material and artifacts related to skiing, but also the various stories associated with the early years. These artifacts and stories remain to be the foundation from which the museum has built its world-class collection.

Upon the museum's opening, Herman 'Jackrabbit' Smith-Johannsen  acted as the Patron of the Canadian Ski Museum, and donated several of his prize possessions to the collection.  Within the museum exhibit is an area devoted to 'Jackrabbit', the protagonist and practitioner of cross country and wilderness skiing who lived and breathed skiing for 111 years of his legendary life.

The Canadian Ski Museum's unparalleled collection of artifacts and archival holdings are a priceless part of Canadian cultural heritage.  Since the Museum's beginnings, the collection has continued to grow, and the presentations of displays and stories about the history of skiing in Canada have increased.  The museum has an incredible collection of photographs, memorabilia, skis, poles and ski clothing donated by skiers, all devoted to preserving the memory of Canada's skiing past.

At present, volunteers supported by a small paid staff, carry out the Museum's activities.  The Museum relies on the support of friends and donors to continue to preserve and present Canadian Ski Heritage.

The Canadian Ski Museum established the Canadian Ski Hall of Fame in 1982 . Since the creation of the Canadian Ski Hall of Fame over 140 people have been inducted. The Canadian Ski Hall of Fame honours the pioneers, competitors, builders and industry personnel that have contributed significantly to Canada's skiing/snowboarding heritage.

The Canadian Ski Museum is a registered Canadian Charity and governed by a Board of Directors, operating through the Chair of the Board and an Executive Committee. The Canadian Ski Museum is recognized by the Fédération Internationale de Ski ("FIS") the International Ski Federation.

Sources 
Virtual Museum of Canada 
Pacific Rim Snow Sports Alliance 
Canadian Museum of Civilization 
International Skiing Heritage Association

See also 

Pierre Harvey
Jackrabbit Johannsen
Nancy Greene
Canadian Ski Patrol

References

External links 
Canadian Ski Museum official website 
Canadian Ski Hall of Fame official website

Museums established in 1971
1971 establishments in Quebec
Museums in Quebec
Sports museums in Canada
Charities based in Canada
Skiing in Canada
Ski museums and halls of fame